Ruwitūn̄tūn̄ is a guyot in the Pacific Ocean which reaches a depth of  below sea level. It is capped off with a summit platform covered in sediments and some volcanic pinnacles with craters. Basaltic rocks have been found on Ruwitūn̄tūn̄.

History 

Aptian to Campanian age has been inferred from fossils found on Ruwitūn̄tūn̄, including Albian rudists. A Campanian limestone has also been found on Ruwitūn̄tūn̄.

Geological context 

They are called guyots and are clustered in an elongated region with and between the Marshall Islands and the Tuamotus. It is presumed that hotspots generated most of these seamounts.

The Marshall Islands are grouped in two chains and three groups, the Ratak Chain including Limalok Guyot, the Ralik Chain including Wōdejebato Guyot and an isolated cluster farther west including Eniwetok Island.

References

Sources 

 
 

Seamounts of the Pacific Ocean
Extinct volcanoes
Landforms of the Marshall Islands
Mesozoic volcanoes